MV Global Mercy is the world's largest civilian hospital ship, constructed as the first purpose-built floating hospital for humanitarian organization Mercy Ships. The contract to build the vessel was awarded to Stena RoRo, Göteborg, Sweden in 2014. Construction was done by China State Shipbuilding Corporation (CSSC) at the Tianjin Xingang Shipyard, Tianjin, China and was completed in 2021. The Global Mercy sailed to Antwerp, Belgium in 2021  for outfitting. In February 2022, the vessel sailed to Rotterdam, the Netherlands, for a two-week PR stopover where it was unveiled to visitors for the first time. In May 2022 the ship sailed on its maiden voyage to Africa where it joined the other vessel in the Mercy Ships fleet, the Africa Mercy, in Dakar, Senegal to begin operating as a floating training center for the first time.

In February 2023, the Global Mercy arrived in the Port of Dakar, Senegal, to begin her first surgical field service. In the span of 5 months, 800 surgeries are expected to take place on board.

The Global Mercy will more than double the surgical capacity and patient beds of Mercy Ships and have an expected lifespan of 50 years. It is expected that more than 150,000 lives will be transformed through surgery alone on the Global Mercy.

Mission

The Global Mercy is designed to double Mercy Ships annual medical capacity and perform a range of surgeries, including maxillofacial and reconstructive surgeries, tumor removals, cleft lip and palate repair, reconstructive plastics, orthopedic surgery, cataract removal, obstetric fistula repair, and more. Mercy Ships provides these surgeries free of charge to patients in their host nations over the course of each 10-month field service. During each field service, Mercy Ships partners with the local government and healthcare leaders to provide specialized training courses, mentor local medical professionals, and strengthen the country's healthcare system.

The Global Mercy joins the organization’s other operating ship, the Africa Mercy, in carrying out the mission of providing hope and healing to those who need it most.

Design and capabilities

The Global Mercy will more than double the organization’s capacity to deliver hope and healing to people without access to safe surgery, while also strengthening local healthcare systems through training and capacity building. The Global Mercy will launch her first field service on the continent of Africa once the hospital outfitting and equipping is complete.

The 174 m, 37,000-ton ship features 12 decks. The hospital, located on decks 3 and 4, contains supply services, 6 operating theaters, 102 acute care beds, 7 ICU beds, and 90 self-care beds. The hospital also features dedicated classroom spaces and simulator labs with state-of-the-art technology for enhanced training of local medical professionals.

In addition to its hospital facilities, the Global Mercy also features meeting and workspaces, as well as accommodation for 641 people. The ship also includes a K-12 Academy for the children of volunteer crew serving on board.

See also
 MV Africa Mercy

References

External links
 Mercy Ships Announcement.
 Short video update about construction, 2021 January 28.

Hospital ships
2020s ships